Schlanger is the surname of the following people:
Gregg Schlanger, Chair of the Department of Art at Central Washington University, U.S.
Judith E. Schlanger (born 1936), French writer and philosopher 
Margo Schlanger (born 1967), American lawyer 
Melanie Schlanger (born 1986), Australian freestyle swimmer
Talia Schlanger, Canadian radio broadcaster